Latisha Chan and Květa Peschke were the defending champions but Chan chose not to participate. 

Peschke played alongside Nicole Melichar and successfully defended her title, defeating Shuko Aoyama and Ena Shibahara in the final, 6−4, 6−4.

Seeds

Draw

Draw

References

External Links
Main Draw

Silicon Valley Classic - Doubles
Silicon Valley Classic